Leutnant Kurt Seit (born 30 July 1894, date of death unknown) was a German World War I flying ace credited with five aerial victories.

Biography

Kurt Seit was born on 30 July 1894. He was serving in the German ground forces when World War I began. He was awarded the Iron Cross Second Class on 3 November 1914. He transferred to aviation duty, serving with Flieger-Abteilung 199 (Flier Detachment 199). He subsequently went for fighter training, which got him posted to Jagdstaffel 80 on 4 June 1918.

On 22 July 1918, he shot down an Airco DH.9 bomber from No. 99 Squadron RAF. Four days later, he was awarded the Iron Cross First Class. He would down an enemy aircraft each of the next four months, bagging two more DH.9s, an observation balloon, and a Breguet XIV.

Although the dates are unknown, Seitz was wounded four times, entitling him to the Silver Wound Badge

Sources of information

Reference
 Above the Lines: The Aces and Fighter Units of the German Air Service, Naval Air Service and Flanders Marine Corps, 1914–1918. Norman Franks, Frank W. Bailey, Russell Guest. Grub Street, 1993. , .

1894 births
Year of death missing
German World War I flying aces
Recipients of the Iron Cross (1914)